Paul David Unwin (born 9 June 1967, in Waipawa, Hawke's Bay) is a New Zealand former first-class cricketer who played for Central Districts and Canterbury in New Zealand and once for Somerset in England.

A right-arm off-spin bowler and a right-handed lower order batsman, Unwin played first-class and List A cricket for Central Districts regularly from the 1986–87 season to 1989–90, reappeared for the side in 1992–93 and then had a single season with Canterbury in 1993–94. His outstanding match was the game between Central Districts and Otago at Palmerston North in 1988–89, when he took six Otago wickets for 42 runs in the first innings and followed that up with four more in the second to finish with match figures of 10 for 152. In no other innings did Unwin take five wickets and his highest score as a batsman was just 38.

Unwin appeared once for Somerset in the tour match against the Australians in 1989: he took five wickets in the match. According to Wisden Cricketers' Almanack, Unwin was on an "exchange" between Central Districts and Somerset. He played eight matches for Somerset's second team in the Second Eleven Championship and took 32 wickets in them.

References

1967 births
Living people
New Zealand cricketers
Canterbury cricketers
Central Districts cricketers
Somerset cricketers
People from Waipawa
Sportspeople from the Hawke's Bay Region
New Zealand expatriate sportspeople in England